Mount Pulaski is a city in Logan County, Illinois, United States. The population was 1,566 at the 2010 census, and 1,481 at a 2018 estimate. It is the home of the Mount Pulaski Courthouse State Historic Site. The city is named in honor of Polish Revolutionary War hero Casimir Pulaski. Mount Pulaski has one high school: Mount Pulaski High School, home of the Hilltoppers. The school colors are purple and gold (MPGS colors are blue and white). Mount Pulaski held the county seat of Logan County from 1848 to 1855.

Geography
Mount Pulaski is located near the geographic center of the state.

Mount Pulaski sits atop a glacial ridge dating to the Illinoian period.

Demographics

As of the census of 2000, there were 1,701 people, 696 households, and 471 families residing in the city. The racial makeup of the city was 99.47% White, 0.06% Native American, 0.06% from other races, and 0.41% from two or more races. Hispanic or Latino of any race were 0.41% of the population.

There were 696 households, out of which 29.5% had children under the age of 18 living with them, 56.3% were married couples living together, 8.0% had a female householder with no husband present, and 32.2% were non-families. 30.0% of all households were made up of individuals, and 18.7% had someone living alone who was 65 years of age or older. The average household size was 2.32 and the average family size was 2.86.

In the city, the population was spread out, with 22.7% under the age of 18, 7.7% from 18 to 24, 24.1% from 25 to 44, 19.7% from 45 to 64, and 25.8% who were 65 years of age or older. The median age was 42 years. For every 100 females, there were 87.5 males. For every 100 females age 18 and over, there were 81.6 males.

The median income for a household in the city was $38,750, and the median income for a family was $46,181. Males had a median income of $37,941 versus $22,250 for females. The per capita income for the city was $18,616. About 4.3% of families and 5.6% of the population were below the poverty line, including 6.1% of those under age 18 and 2.2% of those age 65 or over.

Notable people

 Henry Pierson Crowe, Lieutenant colonel in the USMC (1899–1991); attended high school in Mount Pulaski
 Nicholas L. Hubbard, Illinois state legislator, grain dealer, and farmer; was born in Mount Pulaski
 Vaughn De Leath (1894–1943); First female to sing live on a radio station January 1920 (New York City); was from Mt. Pulaski.
Herbert Ryman (1910-1989), American artist and Disney Imagineer lived in Mt. Pulaski as a youth.
 John Schlitt, leader singer of Petra
 William J. Rothwell, academic and author 
Former Yankee Dennis Werth is a 1971 graduate of Mt. Pulaski High School.

References

External links
 https://cityofmtpulaski.com/

Cities in Illinois
Cities in Logan County, Illinois
Populated places established in 1836
Polish-American culture in Illinois
1836 establishments in Illinois